is a public university in Higashi-ku, Niigata, Niigata Prefecture, Japan. It was established in 2009 by developing Niigata Women's College (closed in March 2012) into a co-educational four-year college.

Organization

Undergraduate schools 
 Faculty of International Studies and Regional Development
 Department of International Studies and Regional Development
 Faculty of Human Life Studies
 Department of Child Studies
 Department of Health and Nutrition

Graduate schools 
 Graduate School of International Studies and Regional Development (to be opened in April 2015)

References

External links 
  

Public universities in Japan
Universities and colleges in Niigata Prefecture
Niigata (city)
Educational institutions established in 2009
2009 establishments in Japan